Michael Weir (born 1966) is a British double murderer and serial burglar who was the first person in British history to have been convicted of the same crime twice.  In 1999, he was jailed for the murder of 78-year-old war veteran Leonard Harris.  Weir's conviction was quashed a year later at the Court of Appeal on a technicality, only for him to be re-convicted in 2019 in a 'double jeopardy' case after new evidence was found. Weir was also convicted in 2019 of the murder of 83-year-old Rose Seferian, who was also killed during a burglary five weeks after Harris, which made additional history as the first time a second murder charge was added to a double jeopardy case. Upon Weir's conviction at the Old Bailey in December 2019, judge Justice McGowan told the jury that they had made "legal history".

Crimes and trials 
Michael Weir was a serial burglar from Hackney in east London. On 28 January 1998, Weir broke into the flat of Leonard and Gertrude Harris, stole a gold watch and ring, killed Leonard Harris and injured Gertrude Harris. Three days after the attack police found a palm print on the bedroom door, but missed a match with Weir at the time as the comparative sample was of poor quality. Five weeks later, on 5 March, Weir broke into the home of 83-year-old Rose Seferian, stole jewellery and cash, and attacked and killed Seferian. 

The police did not initially connect the two crimes.  Weir was tried at the Old Bailey in 1999 for Harris's murder and found guilty, but in 2000 the Court of Appeal quashed his conviction on a technicality and he was freed. His conviction had been based upon DNA which police had erroneously kept on the police database, and the Court of Appeal decided that the trial judge had been wrong to admit this as evidence. The Crown Prosecution Service missed the deadline to appeal the decision to the House of Lords. The Lords later found that in Weir's case the original decision to admit the DNA evidence had been correct, but a retrial was not possible until 2005 when the double jeopardy law was changed in England and Wales to allow those acquitted of crimes to be re-tried if new and compelling evidence was found.

In 2019 Weir was re-tried for Harris's murder after the palm print found at the scene at the time was finally matched to him and because new forensic techniques not available in 1998 revealed that his DNA was at the scene. He was also charged with the murder of Seferian after palm prints found on the window he broke in through were matched to him. Weir had no explanation for the forensic evidence and was convicted of Harris's murder again at the Old Bailey in December 2019, as well as for the murder of Seferian. Harris's daughter-in-law expressed her anger at Weir's original conviction having been quashed, saying: "The defendant has been allowed to get on with his life for 21 years". Judge Justice McGowan told the jury that they had made "legal history" for convicting a defendant a second time of the same crime.

See also
Double jeopardy in the UK post-2003
List of miscarriages of justice in the United Kingdom
Murder of Amanda Duffy
Murder of Billie-Jo Jenkins
Murder of Alison Shaughnessy
Stephen Downing case
Jessie McTavish
David Smith – man acquitted of the murder of a sex worker at the Old Bailey in 1993 only to go on to murder a prostitute in 1999

References

1998 in England
1999 in England
1998 in London
1999 in London
2000 in England
2000 in London
Murder in London
Criminals from London
English people convicted of murder
People convicted of murder by England and Wales
Crime in London
People acquitted of murder
People from Hackney, London
English prisoners sentenced to life imprisonment
Living people
1998 murders in the United Kingdom
British male criminals
Overturned convictions in England
Court of Appeal (England and Wales) cases
1998 in British law
1999 in British law
2000 in British law
2019 in British law
People wrongfully convicted of murder
Trials in London
Murder trials
Trials in England
1990s trials
2010s trials
Old Bailey
1966 births